Our Mann Flute is an album by American jazz flautist Herbie Mann released on the Atlantic label in 1966. The album features tracks from sessions that produced the albums The Common Ground (1960), My Kinda Groove (1964) along with more recent recordings.

Reception

Allmusic awarded the album 3 stars.

Track listing
 "Scratch" (Wayne Henderson) – 2:32
 "Philly Dog" (Rufus Thomas) – 2:26
 "Happy Brass" (Herbie Mann) – 2:09
 "Good Lovin'" (Rudy Clark, Arthur Resnick) – 2:54
 "Theme from "This Is My Beloved"" (Mann) – 5:07
 "Frère Jacques" (Traditional) – 2:14
 "Our Man Flint" (Jerry Goldsmith) – 2:40
 "Fiddler on the Roof" (Jerry Bock, Sheldon Harnick) – 2:21
 "Theme from "Malamondo" (Funny World)" (Ennio Morricone) – 2:16
 "Down by the Riverside" (Traditional) – 2:34
 "Monday, Monday" (John Phillips) – 2:57
 "Skip to My Lou" (Traditional) – 2:20
Recorded in New York City on August 3, 1960 (track 3), February 13, 1964 (track 10), May 7, 1964 (track 5), October 29, 1964 (tracks 6, 8, 9 & 12), March 10, 1966 (track 7) and May 26, 1966 (tracks 1, 2, 4 & 11)

Personnel 
Herbie Mann – flute – with multiple ensembles including:
Leo Ball, Doc Cheatham, Al DeRisi, Jerome Kail, Marky Markowitz, Joe Newman, Jimmy Owens, Ernie Royal, Ziggy Schatz, Clark Terry, Snooky Young – trumpet 
Bob Alexander, Quentin Jackson, Jimmy Knepper, Joe Orange, Santo Russo, Chauncey Welsch – trombone
Tony Studd – bass trombone
Jerry Dodgion – flute, clarinet, alto saxophone
Richie Kamuca – clarinet, tenor saxophone
King Curtis – tenor saxophone, baritone saxophone
Pepper Adams – baritone saxophone
Dave Pike, Johnny Rae – vibraphone
Don Friedman, Jimmy Wisner – piano
Al Gorgoni, Mundell Lowe, Charles Macey, Attila Zoller – guitar
Milt Hinton, Jack Six, Knobby Totah, Reggie Workman – bass
Joe Mack – electric bass
Bruno Carr, Rudy Collins, Bernard Purdie, Bobby Thomas – drums
Willie Bobo, Gary Chester – timbales, percussion 
Ray Barretto, Warren Smith, Carlos "Patato" Valdes – congas
Ray Mantilla – bongos
Michael Olatunji – percussion, vocals
George Devens – percussion
Maya Angela, Dolores Parker – vocals
Anthony Bambino, Hinda Barnett, Emanuel Green, Harry Katzman, Leo Kruczek, Gene Orloff, Paul Winter – violin
Charles McCracken, Kermit Moore – cello
Herbie Mann (tracks 3, 10), Arif Mardin (track 7), Oliver Nelson (track 5), Richard Wess (tracks 6, 8, 9, 12), Jimmy Wisner (tracks 1, 2, 10, 11) – arranger, conductor

References 

1966 albums
Herbie Mann albums
Albums produced by Nesuhi Ertegun
Atlantic Records albums
Albums arranged by Oliver Nelson
Albums arranged by Arif Mardin